Once Upon a Time in the West: The Original Soundtrack Recording is a soundtrack composed by Ennio Morricone, from the 1968 western film of the same name directed by Sergio Leone, released in 1972. The film score sold about 10 million copies worldwide.

The soundtrack features leitmotifs that relate to each of the main characters of the film (each with their own theme music), as well as to the spirit of the American West. The theme music for Jill McBain, Claudia Cardinale's character, has wordless vocals by Italian singer Edda Dell'Orso.

It was Leone's desire to have the music available and played during filming. Leone had Morricone compose the score before shooting started and would play the music in the background for the actors on set.

In 2018, for the 50th anniversary of the film, the Italian records company "Beat Records" released a limited 500 copies edition.

Track listing

Original release 
"Once Upon a Time in the West" – 3:46
"As a Judgment" – 3:08
"Farewell to Cheyenne" – 2:40
"The Transgression" – 4:43
"The First Tavern" – 1:41
"The Second Tavern" - 1:34
"Man with a Harmonica" – 3:31
"A Dimly Lit Room" – 5:09
"Bad Orchestra" – 2:25
"The Man" – 1:03
"Jill's America" – 2:48
"Death Rattle" – 1:45
"Finale" – 4:13

Expanded edition 
An expanded and remastered album was released in Italy in November 2005.

"Once Upon a Time in the West" - 3:43
"The Man" - 1:03
"The Grand Massacre" - 2:40
"Arrival at the Station" - 0:55
"Bad Orchestra" - 2:25
"Jill's America" - 2:47
"Harmonica" - 2:27
"The First Tavern" - 1:39
"A Bed Too Large" - 1:32
"Jill" - 1:47
"Frank" - 1:52
"Cheyenne" - 1:16
"The Second Tavern" - 1:33
"The Third Tavern" - 1:19
"Epilogue" - 1:14
"On the Roof of the Train" - 1:19
"Man with a Harmonica" - 3:30
"A Dimly Lit Room" - 5:08
"The Transgression" - 4:41
"Return to the Train" - 0:40
"Morton" - 1:36
"As a Judgment" - 3:08
"Final Duel" - 3:35
"Death Rattle" - 1:44
"Birth of a City" - 4:25
"Farewell to Cheyenne" - 2:38
"Finale" - 4:08

Sampling 
The track "Man with a Harmonica" was sampled by Beats International for their record Dub Be Good to Me (released in January 1990) and by The Orb for their record Little Fluffy Clouds (released in November 1990). Claude Challe in his album Sun played a remix of "Man with a Harmonica" in CD 2 Lovely Sunset (released in 2001).

Certifications

References 

Ennio Morricone soundtracks
1972 soundtrack albums
RCA Records soundtracks